Clyde Lynn (March 3, 1936 – November 1, 1996) was a NASCAR Winston Cup driver from Christiansburg, Virginia and a runner-up for the NASCAR Rookie of the Year award in the year 1965. Lynn's career consisted of eight top-five finishes, 73 top-ten finishes, $70866 in total career earnings, an average career start of 20th, an average career finish of 14th, and 24285.7 miles (37179 laps) of total racing experience. Lynn was also a participant of the 1968 Fireball 300.

References

1936 births
1996 deaths
NASCAR drivers
People from Christiansburg, Virginia
Racing drivers from Virginia